Hasta encontrarte is a Chilean telenovela created by Ximena Carrera for Mega. It aired from June 22, 2022 to December 12, 2022. It stars Luz Valdivieso, Daniel Alcaíno, Sigrid Alegría, Álvaro Morales and César Sepúlveda.

Plot 
Catalina Cienfuegos (Luz Valdivieso), at the age of 18, gives birth to a baby girl named Emilia, who dies of natural causes a few hours after birth. This causes her to break up with her boyfriend and father of the baby, Lautaro Cáceres (Daniel Alcaíno). Twenty-one years later, the couple is reunited after suspecting that their daughter might still be alive, so they team up to try to find her. The suspicions point to Catalina's own family, who intervened, with the help of the well-known priest Francisco Echeñique (Alejandro Trejo), so that the baby girl was placed for adoption.

Cast 
 Luz Valdivieso as Catalina Cienfuegos
 Octavia Bernasconi as Young Catalina
 Daniel Alcaíno as Lautaro Cáceres
 Max Salgado as Young Lautaro
 Sigrid Alegría as Asunción Echeñique
 Álvaro Morales as Esteban Ugalde
 César Sepúlveda as Cristóbal Gaete
 Coca Guazzini as Piedad Azócar
 Alejandro Trejo as Francisco Echeñique
 Lorena Capetillo as Pamela Castaño
 Francisco Ossa as Jaime Benavente
 Gabriel Prieto as Anselmo Cáceres
 Valentina Acuña as Muriel Benavente
 Andrew Bargsted as Iván Huaiquipán
 Juan Carlos Maldonado as Gabriel Ugalde
 Catalina Benítez as Montserrat Gaete
 Matías Alarcón
 Helen Mrugalski as Blanca Gaete
 Osvaldo Silva as Gonzalo Cienfuegos
 María José Prieto as Vanessa
 María Elena Duvauchelle
 Patricio Achurra

Ratings

References

External links 
 

2022 telenovelas
2022 Chilean television series debuts
2022 Chilean television series endings
Chilean telenovelas
Mega (Chilean TV channel) telenovelas
Spanish-language telenovelas